Leslie Iwerks is an American producer, director, and writer. She is daughter of Disney Legend Don Iwerks and granddaughter of Disney Legend Ub Iwerks, the animator and co-creator of Mickey Mouse and Oswald the Lucky Rabbit. She has directed films including Recycled Life which was nominated for an Academy Award and The Pixar Story which was nominated for an Emmy for best nonfiction special.

She is a member of the Documentary Branch of the Academy of Motion Picture Arts and Sciences, the Academy of Television Arts & Sciences, the Producers Guild of America, and the International Documentary Association.

She has worked with non-profit organizations Save Our Seas, Safe Passage, NRDC, and the Sierra Club to raise awareness on matters affecting the globe. She currently helms Santa Monica-based production company Iwerks & Co.

Biography
Iwerks graduated with a BA from the University of Southern California and currently is a member of the USC School of Cinematic Arts Alumni Council.

In 1999, Walt Disney Pictures released her first feature-length documentary, The Hand Behind the Mouse: The Ub Iwerks Story, chronicling the life of her grandfather, Ub Iwerks. The film was narrated by Kelsey Grammer.

In 2000, Iwerks began working on numerous ethnographic documentaries in Guatemala which culminated in the film Recycled Life (2006), which was nominated for the Academy Award Best Documentary (Short Subject) category. The film documented the lives of Guatemalans who live and work in the largest landfill in Central America. The film was narrated by Edward James Olmos. Recycled Life went on to raise an estimated $3 million for Safe Passage, a non-profit organization building schools for children who work in the dump.

The Pixar Story (2007), about the rise of Pixar Animation Studios was nominated for a Primetime Emmy Award in the Outstanding Nonfiction Special category and was additionally nominated for the A.C.E. Eddie Awards for Best Edited Documentary. The feature-length documentary was narrated by Stacy Keach and includes interviews with John Lasseter, Steve Jobs, Ed Catmull, George Lucas, Tom Hanks, and other producers, directors, and artists. Variety wrote, "The movie is, above all else, a celebration of animation in all its forms. Iwerks naturally has a firm grasp of the medium’s history and rightly sees Pixar as the catalyst for the recent resurgence of audience interest in animation."

In 2008, Iwerks' short documentary Downstream, brought awareness to the environmental effects of oil sands production in Alberta, Canada, as well as rare cancers being found downstream in the aboriginal community of Fort Chipewyan. Because the film scrutinized the local government's pro-oil policies and was partially subsidized by the Alberta Film Fund, it prompted Alberta's Minister of Culture, Lindsay Blackett, to criticize the film, which in turn, sparked public outcry as to whether films subsidized by the government would be allowed freedom of artistic expression. The film was short-listed for the Academy Awards Best Documentary (Short Subject) category in 2008.

Iwerks released Industrial Light & Magic: Creating the Impossible (2010), which chronicles the developments of visual effects house Industrial Light & Magic from the earliest days of Star Wars to Star Trek Beyond. The documentary is narrated by Tom Cruise and features interviews with George Lucas, Steven Spielberg, Ron Howard, Robin Williams, J. J. Abrams, Jerry Bruckheimer, Samuel L. Jackson, Seth Green, Jon Favreau, and various ILM visual effects supervisors.

In 2011, the Biografilm Festival in Bologna, Italy, paid tribute to Iwerks through a multi-day retrospective of her documentary films.

Iwerks' short environmental documentary Pipe Dreams (2011), about the controversy behind the Keystone XL pipeline, was narrated by Daryl Hannah and won the Ashland Independent Film Festival award for Best Documentary Short. The film was also short-listed for the Academy Awards Best Documentary (Short Subject) category in 2012.

Iwerks' 2012 documentary, Citizen Hearst, charting the 125-year history of the Hearst media empire, premiered at the Hamptons International Film Festival. The film is narrated by William H. Macy, and features interviews with Oprah Winfrey, Dan Rather, Mark Burnett, Ralph Lauren, Donna Karan, Bob Iger, Leonard Maltin, Dr. Oz, Heidi Klum and various members of the Hearst family and company.

In 2013, the San Luis Obispo International Film Festival showcased a retrospective of her documentary work, and honored her with the festival's Spotlight Award.

In 2016, she was honored by The Bay Foundation for her environmental impact through filmmaking. Additionally, she was commended by California Assemblymen Richard Bloom and Mike Giatto for her profound commitment to environmental stewardship through penetrating, exemplary documentary filmmaking addressing critical national and global issues.

Iwerks' 2016 documentary, Ella Brennan: Commanding the Table, about famed New Orleans restaurateur Ella Brennan premiered at the New Orleans Film Festival and won the Audience Award. The film is narrated by Academy Award-nominated actress Patricia Clarkson, and features interviews with Emeril Lagasse, Danny Meyer, Daniel Boulud, Drew Nieporent, Jeremiah Tower, and others. The film began streaming on Netflix in May 2017.

In 2017, Iwerks embarked on a journey to Macedonia where she uncovered the inside world of fake news created by Macedonian teenagers. The short film follows how the proliferation of fake news impacted the U.S. 2016 Presidential Election and worldwide elections thereafter. Selling Lies was directed, edited, and produced by Iwerks. Morgan Freeman’s production company Revelations Entertainment co-produced the film. The film, completed in 2018, premiered and won the Best Short Documentary at the Santa Barbara International Film Festival. The film then went on to win Best Documentary Short at San Luis Obispo International Film Festival, Dumbo Film Festival, DOC LA, and Ridgefield Independent Film Festival.

In 2019, League of Legends Origins premiered on Netflix. The Iwerks directed feature-length documentary takes viewers around the world to chronicle the rise of today's number one played online game in the world, League of Legends. In association with Riot Games, Iwerks spent four years documenting the ups and downs and global growth of the billion-dollar esports business and community that grew up around it.

In 2013, Iwerks began producing and directing a documentary series on the history of Walt Disney Imagineering, the division responsible for designing Disney theme parks and other attractions. The Imagineering Story premiered on the Disney+ streaming service at launch on November 12, 2019, with Academy Award-nominated actress Angela Bassett narrating. This documentary series looks at the more than 65-year history of Walt Disney Imagineering through parallel storylines focused on the people, the craft, and the business. Reviews of the series called it everything from the "crown jewel of the first wave of original programming to Disney+" to "a surprisingly honest history of how Disney’s theme parks were made."

Filmography

References

External links
Leslie Iwerks official website

Living people
American film directors
American documentary filmmakers
American people of Frisian descent
Disney people
Year of birth missing (living people)